Borjak-e Naqdali (also Romanized as Borjak-e Naqd‘alī; also known as Naqd ‘Alī, Naqd ‘Alī Pā’īn, and Qal‘eh-ye Naqd ‘Alī) is a village in Qaleh Hamam Rural District, Salehabad County, Razavi Khorasan Province, Iran. At the 2006 census, its population was 298, in 53 families.

References 

Populated places in   Torbat-e Jam County